Ladik is a city of Samsun Province, Turkey on the site of the ancient Laodicea Pontica. The mayor is Selim Özbalci (AKP).

History

Laodicea Pontica or Laodicea, also transliterated as Laodíceia and Laodíkeia, was a Hellenistic town in Pontus. The city was founded in the hills (elevation 1000 m) not far west of the lake Stiphane Limne, southwest of Amisus (modern Samsun). It is the birthplace of the Albanian grand vizier Tayyar Mehmed Pasha.

See also 
 List of ancient Greek cities
Oleg Ladik (born 1971), Ukrainian-born Canadian Olympic wrestler
Katalin Ladik (born 1942), Hungarian poet, writer, performance artist

References

Populated places in Samsun Province
Archaeological sites in the Black Sea Region
Ancient Greek archaeological sites in Turkey
Seleucid colonies in Anatolia
Greek colonies in Pontus
Ski areas and resorts in Turkey
Districts of Samsun Province